Ismael Gutiérrez Montilla (born 10 October 2000), sometimes known simply as Ismael, is a Spanish footballer who plays as a central midfielder for CF La Nucía.

Club career
Born in Los Palacios y Villafranca, Seville, Andalusia, Ismael represented Real Betis as a youth. He made his senior debut with the reserves on 14 April 2019, starting in a 3–0 Tercera División home win against Córdoba CF B.

On 4 July 2019, Ismael renewed his contract until 2021 and was called up to the pre-season with the main squad. He made his professional – and La Liga – debut on 20 September, coming on as a late substitute for Andrés Guardado in a 0–0 away draw against CA Osasuna.

On 13 January 2020, Ismael extended his contract until 2023 and was immediately loaned to fellow top tier side Deportivo Alavés until June 2021. On 3 October, however, he agreed to a contract with Atlético Madrid and was initially assigned to the B-team in Segunda División B.

On 13 July 2021, Ismael was loaned to Segunda División side Málaga CF for the season. On 24 June of the following year, after featuring rarely, he moved to Primera Federación side CF La Nucía.

Personal life
Ismael's cousin Fabián is also a footballer and a midfielder. He too was groomed at Betis.

Career statistics

Club

References

External links

Beticopedia profile 

2000 births
Living people
People from Los Palacios y Villafranca
Sportspeople from the Province of Seville
Footballers from Andalusia
Spanish footballers
Association football midfielders
La Liga players
Segunda División players
Segunda División B players
Tercera División players
Betis Deportivo Balompié footballers
Real Betis players
Deportivo Alavés players
Atlético Madrid B players
Málaga CF players
CF La Nucía players